Joanne Elizabeth Belknap is an American criminologist and Professor of Ethnic Studies at the University of Colorado at Boulder (UC-Boulder). 

Belknap was named a Fellow of the American Society of Criminology. She trained at Temple University's Inside-Out Prison Exchange Program. She studies jail-to-community reentry and implementing college courses in prisons. She was awarded the 2009 Elizabeth D. Gee Memorial Lectureship Award, which recognizes efforts to advance women in academia, interdisciplinary scholarly contributions and distinguished teaching. 

She was formerly the chair of the sociology department there from 2013 until she stepped down in 2014. She was the president of the American Society of Criminology from 2013 to 2014.

Publications 
Belknap, Joanne The Invisible Woman: Gender, Crime, and Justice, 5th edition (2020) SAGE Publishing 
Belknap, J., & Grant, D. (2021). Domestic violence policy: A world of change. Feminist criminology, 16(3), 382-395.
Roche, E., Belknap, J., Billica, N., & Villanueva, N. (2020). Race, Tasing, and Children: How the Use of Tasers Has Been Overlooked as a Method of Police Brutality and the Consequences for Black Children.
Belknap, J. (2020). America’s Jails: The Search for Human Dignity in an Age of Mass Incarceration.
Belknap, Joanne & Deanne Grant. 2018. Fifty Years After the 1967 Crime Commission Report: How Non-Policing Domestic Violence Research and Policies Have Changed and Expanded. Crime & Public Policy,17(2):467-481. Read now 
Whalley, E., & Belknap, J. (2018). Patriarchy and crime. In The Routledge Companion to Criminological Theory and Concepts (pp. 342-346). Routledge.
Belknap, Joanne. 2015. Activist Criminology: Criminologists’ Responsibility to Advocate for Social and Legal Justice. Criminology, 52(1):1-22. To read click here
Lynch, Shannon, Dana DeHart, Joanne Belknap, Bonnie Green, Priscilla Dass-Brailsford, Kristine Johnson, & Wong, M.M. 2017. An Examination of the Associations among Victimization, Mental Health, and Offending in Women. Criminal Justice & Behavior, 44(6):796-814.
Joanne Belknap, Shannon Lynch, and Dana DeHart. 2015. Jail Staff Members’ Views on Jailed Women’s Mental Health, Trauma, Offending, Rehabilitation, and Reentry. Prison Journal, 96(1):79-101.
DePrince, Anne, Susan E. Buckingham & Joanne Belknap. 2014. The Geography of Intimate Partner Abuse Experiences and Clinical Responses. 2014. Clinical Psychological Science, 2(3):258-271.
Belknap, Joanne, Kristi Holsinger & Jani Little. 2012. Sexual Minority Status, Abuse, and Self-Harming Behaviors among Incarcerated Girls.  Journal of Child & Adolescent Trauma, 5(2):173-185.
McDaniels-Wilson, Cathy, & Joanne Belknap. 2008. The Extensive Sexual Violation and Sexual Abuse Histories of Incarcerated Women. Violence Against Women, 14(10):1090-1127. (Winner of the Sage Best Article of 2008 in Violence Against Women).

Contributions to Edited Collections 
Belknap, J., & Grant, D. (2020). Feminist activism and scholarship in resisting and responding to gender-based abuse. In The Emerald Handbook of Feminism, Criminology and Social Change. Emerald Publishing Limited.
Eigenberg, Helen, Stephanie Bonnes, & Joanne Belknap. “Managing the Backlash,” in Catherine Kaukinen, Michelle Hughes Miller, & Ráchael Powers (Eds.) Addressing Violence Against Women on College Campuses. Philadelphia: Temple University Press, pp. 285-303.
Belknap, Joanne, & Molly Bowers. 2016. “Girls and Women in Gangs,” in Carlos Cuevas & Callie Marie Rennison (Eds.) Handbook on the Psychology of Violence. New York: Wiley-Blackwell, pp. 211-25.

References

External links
Faculty page

Living people
American women criminologists
American criminologists
University of Colorado Boulder faculty
University of Colorado Boulder alumni
Michigan State University alumni
Presidents of the American Society of Criminology
American women social scientists
Year of birth missing (living people)
21st-century American women